The Stag Inn attack was a sectarian gun attack, on 30 July 1976, carried out by a group of Belfast IRA Volunteers using the cover name Republican Action Force. Four Protestants, all civilians, the youngest being 48 years old and the eldest 70, were all killed in the attack with several others being injured. This was the latest in a string of sectarian attacks in Belfast and Mid Ulster, Northern Ireland by different paramilitary organizations.

Background
Since an IRA ceasefire was agreed upon with the British government which came into effect on 10 February 1975, Loyalist paramilitaries in Ulster, worried the then Labour government was about to sell them out to a United Ireland started carrying out large numbers of sectarian attacks, the Ulster Volunteer Force and Ulster Defence Association used cover names for their sectarian attacks like Protestant Action Force, Ulster Freedom Fighters and Red Hand Commando. The majority of these attacks took place in Belfast and an area which was known as the "murder triangle" in parts of counties Armagh and Tyrone around Mid Ulster. On 5 April 1975 the Protestant Action Force carried out a bomb attack on a pub in the New Lodge area of Belfast killing two Catholic civilians, later on, the same day, Irish Republicans carried out the Mountainview Tavern attack on Belfast's Shankill Road killing four Protestant civilians and a UDA member, later on, the same night a Catholic civilian was shot dead by loyalists in the Ardoyne area. 
The first attack claimed by the Republican Action Force was the Tullyvallen massacre in which five Protestant civilians were killed and seven others injured, the attackers used the prefix "South Armagh" Republican Action Force (SARAF) to claim this attack, all those killed were members of the Irish chapter of the Protestant fraternity group the Orange Order, which Irish Catholics in Northern Ireland viewed as a sectarian group.
The smaller Irish Republican paramilitary group the Irish National Liberation Army (INLA) also carried out at least one sectarian attack during this period, when, on New Year's eve 1975/76 members of the INLA carried out a bomb attack on a pub in the village of Gilford, County Down killing three Protestant civilians and injuring 30 others, the cover name "People's Republican Army" was used to claim the attack.

The most lethal attack carried out by the RAF was the Kingsmill massacre on 5 January 1976. In that attack, its members, up to 12 of whom were armed stopped a minibus near Kingsmill in south County Armagh and shot 11 Protestant workmen, all civilians, who were travelling in it and let the only Catholic on the bus escape. 10 men died; one survived despite being shot 18 times.

Attack
The Stag Inn was a Protestant-owned Hotel & Bar.

The attack took place on a Saturday at 8:00 pm on 30 July 1976 in the Stag Inn, just off Milltown Road, in Belvoir Park Forest a more affluent area in south Belfast. A car with at least 3 IRA/RAF men pulled up outside in a car that was hijacked earlier on in the day, one of the gunmen jumped out of the car & immediately fired at the doorman John McLeave (48) who was standing outside the bar on security duty with nearly a dozen bullets hitting him, once the two gunmen enter the Stag Inn bar they sprayed it with bullets, inside  John Mackey (50) and James Doherty (70), were both killed instantly from several bursts of fire from automatic rifles the bar, hitting several more people, one of whom was Thompson "Robert" McCreight (60) who died of his injuries just over a week later on 8 August 1976, and several others were injured in the attack. The gunmen escaped in the getaway car. waiting outside for them. The attackers claimed it was retaliation for a loyalist attack the day before on the 29 July 1976, when a loyalist hit team killed three Catholic civilians in The Whitefort Inn pub, on the Andersonstown Road, Belfast. This was the last major sectarian attack claimed by the Republican Action Force in 1976.

Earlier on in the day, the Provisional IRA Derry Brigade killed a Protestant Ulster Defence Regiment soldier with a booby-trap bomb at a farm in Druminard near the village of Moneymore. Less than 24 hours later another Protestant was killed by Republicans, this time an IRA sniper shot dead a Protestant civilian at a security barrier at Church Street in Lurgan. This brought the number of Protestants killed in a 24-hour period by the IRA/RAF to six, with at least half a dozen injured.

Aftermath
The group claimed only two more killings after the Stag Inn shootings, on the 2 April 1977 the killing of a Protestant civilian in Forkhill in south Armagh, and the killing of another Protestant the same month on 21 April 1977 near Shankill Road in Belfast.
The former commander of the IRA's Belfast Brigade Brendan Hughes (who was in prison during the period), when interviewed by the journalist Peter Taylor commented on the effect of the sectarian killings in Belfast:
 "When the ceasefire was on, the whole machine (the IRA) slipped into sectarianism and a lot of us were very, very unhappy with that situation. I didn't believe that Tullyvallen and other (similar) attacks were going to achieve anything. I believed they were counterproductive. Sectarian bombings and sectarian killings were doing nothing except destroying the whole struggle". 
A month later on 16 August 1976, in the south Armagh village of Keady, the UVF and along with other members of the Glenanne gang carried out the 1976 Step Inn pub bombing killing two Catholic civilians, both women and injuring 20 others. The tit-for-tat sectarian attacks largely died down after this attack.

See also
Store Bar shooting
Bayardo Bar attack
Mountainview Tavern attack

References

1976 in Northern Ireland
1976 mass shootings in Europe
1970s mass shootings in the United Kingdom
Attacks on bars in Northern Ireland
Deaths by firearm in Northern Ireland
July 1976 events in the United Kingdom
Mass murder in 1976
Massacres in 1976
Provisional Irish Republican Army actions
The Troubles in Belfast
The Troubles in County Antrim